Bavarisaurus ('Bavarian lizard') is an extinct genus of basal squamate found in the Solnhofen limestone near Bavaria, Germany. A fossil skeleton found in the stomach region of a Compsognathus, a small theropod dinosaur, was originally assigned to the genus, but was renamed to Schoenesmahl in 2017.

The holotype is BSPHM 1873 III. Part of the holotype is now lost.

References 

Solnhofen fauna
Jurassic lizards
Scincogekkonomorpha
Fossil taxa described in 1953